The men's football tournament at the 2008 Summer Olympics was held in Beijing and four other cities in the People's Republic of China from 7 to 23 August. Associations affiliated with FIFA were invited to enter their men's under-23 teams in regional qualifying competitions, from which 15 teams, plus the host nation, reached the final tournament. Men's teams were allowed to augment their squads with up to three players over the age of 23.

For these Games, the men competed in a 16-team tournament. Preliminary matches commenced on 7 August, the day before the Games' opening ceremony. The teams were grouped into four pools of four teams each for a round-robin preliminary round. The top two teams in each pool advanced to an eight-team single-elimination bracket.

The tournament was won by Argentina, who beat Nigeria 1–0 in the final, as part of a record streak of 12 consecutive wins in football competitions at the Summer Olympics (six wins in 2004, six wins in 2008).

Despite the absence of an official best player award, the FIFA website highlighted Lionel Messi's campaign by stating that he "posed defenders more problems than anyone else in the tournament". Juan Román Riquelme and Javier Mascherano also received special mentions.

Qualification

A National Olympic Committee may enter one men's team in football competitions.

Squads

For the men's tournament, each nation submitted a squad of 18 players, 15 of whom had to be born on or after 1 January 1985, and three of whom could be overage players, by 23 July 2008. A minimum of two goalkeepers (plus one optional alternate goalkeeper) had to be included in the squad.

Match officials
On 22 April 2008, FIFA released the list of match referees that will officiate at the Olympics.

All times are China Standard Time (UTC+8).

Group stage
Group winners and runners-up advanced to the quarter-finals.

Group A

Group B

Group C

Group D

Knockout stage

Quarter-finals

Semi-finals

Bronze medal match

Gold medal match

Source for cards:

Final ranking

Statistics

Goalscorers

With four goals, Giuseppe Rossi of Italy was the top scorer in the tournament. In total, 75 goals were scored by 53 different players, with only one of them credited as own goal.

4 goals
 Giuseppe Rossi

3 goals
 Mousa Dembélé
 Victor Obinna

2 goals

 Sergio Agüero
 Ezequiel Lavezzi
 Ángel Di María
 Lionel Messi
 Kevin Mirallas
 Diego
 Jô
 Thiago Neves
 Ronaldinho
 Rafael Sóbis
 Sekou Cissé
 Salomon Kalou
 Gerald Sibon
 Chinedu Obasi
 Sacha Kljestan

1 goal

 Lautaro Acosta
 Diego Buonanotte
 Juan Román Riquelme
 Ruben Zadkovich
 Laurent Ciman
 Faris Haroun
 Anderson
 Hernanes
 Marcelo
 Alexandre Pato
 Georges Mandjeck
 Stéphane Mbia
 Dong Fangzhuo
 Robert Acquafresca
 Sebastian Giovinco
 Riccardo Montolivo
 Tommaso Rocchi
 Gervinho
 Yohei Toyoda
 Kim Dong-jin
 Park Chu-young
 Ryan Babel
 Otman Bakkal
 Jeremy Brockie
 Olubayo Adefemi
 Victor Anichebe
 Peter Odemwingie
 Chibuzor Okonkwo
 Isaac Promise
 Miljan Mrdaković
 Slobodan Rajković
 Đorđe Rakić
 Jozy Altidore
 Stuart Holden

Own goals
 Slobodan Rajković (playing against Ivory Coast)

References

External links

Olympic Football Tournaments Beijing 2008 – Men at FIFA
 RSSSF Summary
FIFA Technical Report

 
Men
2008
Lionel Messi